Mare Nostrum (Latin: "Our Sea") was a Roman name for the Mediterranean Sea. In Classical Latin, it would have been pronounced , and in Ecclesiastical Latin, it is pronounced .

In the decades following the 1861 unification of Italy, Italian nationalists and Italian fascists who saw Italy as the successor state to the Roman Empire attempted to revive the term.

Roman usage
The term Mare Nostrum originally was used by the Ancient Romans to refer to the Tyrrhenian Sea after their conquest of Sicily, Sardinia and Corsica during the Punic Wars with Carthage. By 30 BC, Roman dominion had extended from the Iberian Peninsula to Egypt, and Mare Nostrum began to be used in the context of the whole Mediterranean Sea. Other names were also employed, including Mare Internum ("Internal Sea"), but they did not include Mare Mediterraneum, which was a Late Latin creation that was attested to only well after the Fall of Rome.

Italian nationalist usage
In the decades following the 1861 unification of Italy, Italian nationalists who saw Italy as the successor state to the Roman Empire attempted to revive the term. In particular, the rise of Italian nationalism during the "Scramble for Africa" of the 1880s led to calls for the establishment of an Italian colonial empire, which introduced for the first time a renewed and modern concept of Mare Nostrum:

Fascist usage

The term was again taken up by Benito Mussolini for use in fascist propaganda, in a similar manner to Adolf Hitler's Lebensraum. Mussolini wanted to re-establish the greatness of the Roman Empire and believed that Italy was the most powerful of the Mediterranean countries after World War I.  He declared that "the twentieth century will be a century of Italian power" and created one of the most powerful navies of the world in order to control the Mediterranean Sea.

When World War II started, Italy was already a major Mediterranean power that controlled the north and south shores of the central basin. After the fall of France removed the main threat from the west, the British Mediterranean Fleet, with bases in UK-controlled Gibraltar, Malta, Cyprus, Egypt, and Mandatory Palestine remained the only threat to Italian naval power in the Mediterranean.  The invasions of Albania, Greece, Yugoslavia and Egypt, and the Siege of Malta sought to extend Axis control over the Sea. This policy was so far-reaching and potentially intrusive, that it threatened neutral nations like Turkey, a threat that İsmet İnönü, the president of Turkey at the time of war, countered by promising to enter the war only if the Soviet Union joined the Allies.

Mussolini wished to create an Imperial Italy around his own idea of a "Mare Nostrum" and promoted the fascist project—to be realized in a future peace conference after the anticipated Axis victory—of an enlarged Italian Empire, stretching from the Mediterranean shores of Egypt to the Indian Ocean shores of Somalia and eastern Kenya. He referred to making the Mediterranean Sea "an Italian lake".  This aim, however, was challenged throughout the campaign by the Allied navies at sea and the Allied armies and resistance movements on land. For example, Greece had easily been incorporated into the Roman Empire, but the new Greek state proved to be too powerful for Italian conquest, and Greece remained independent until German forces arrived to assist the Italian invasion. Despite periods of Axis ascendancy during the Battle of the Mediterranean it was never realized, and ended altogether with the final Italian defeat of September 1943.

Contemporary usage

Mare Nostrum is the title of a best-selling novel by Spanish author Vicente Blasco Ibáñez, published in 1918. A film based on it was released in 1948.

The term "Mare Nostrum" was chosen as the theme for the Inaugural Conference of the Society for Mediterranean Law and Culture, being held in June 2012 at the University of Cagliari Faculty of Law, Sardinia, Italy ("La Conferenza Inaugurale della Società di Diritto e Cultura del Mediterraneo").  In this contemporary usage, the term is intended to embrace the full diversity of Mediterranean cultures, with a particular focus on exchanges and cooperation among Mediterranean nations.

Following the 2013 Lampedusa migrant shipwreck, the Italian government decided to strengthen the national system for the patrolling of the Mediterranean sea by authorizing "Operation Mare Nostrum," a military and humanitarian operation in order to rescue the migrants and arrest the traffickers of immigrants.

See also
Nine-dash line
Baltic Sea

References

Citations

Bibliography

History of the Mediterranean
Italian Fascism
Ancient Roman geography
Latin words and phrases